
Gmina Pułtusk is an urban-rural gmina (administrative district) in Pułtusk County, Masovian Voivodeship, in east-central Poland.

Villages
Apart from the town of Pułtusk, Gmina Pułtusk contains the villages and settlements of Białowieża, Boby, Chmielewo, Głodowo, Gnojno, Grabówiec, Gromin, Jeżewo, Kacice, Kleszewo, Kokoszka, Lipa, Lipniki Nowe, Lipniki Stare, Moszyn, Olszak, Pawłówek, Płocochowo, Ponikiew, Przemiarowo, Szygówek, Trzciniec and Zakręt.

Neighbouring gminas
Gmina Pułtusk is bordered by the gminas of Gzy, Karniewo, Obryte, Pokrzywnica, Szelków, Winnica and Zatory.

References

Polish official population figures 2006

Pultusk
Pułtusk County